The Jerrahi Order or Jerrahiyya is a Sufi order that originated in 18th century Constantinople and descended from the charismatic Halveti Order of 14th century Persia. Their founding saint is Hazreti Pîr Muhammad Nureddin al-Jerrahi (1678-1720), who lived in the Ottoman capitol and is enshrined at the site of his tekke in Fatih, Istanbul. By some accounts, Pir Nureddin was a direct descendant of Prophet Muhammad both from his mother and father. The path he founded is dedicated to the teachings and traditions through an unbroken chain of spiritual transmission (silsilah) that goes directly back to the Prophet Muhammad and his Companions. During the late Ottoman period, the Order was widespread throughout the Balkans, particularly Macedonia and southern Greece (Morea). The Jerrahi Order of Dervishes is a cultural, educational, and social relief organization with members from diverse professional, ethnic, and national backgrounds.

The historic seat of the Halveti-Jerrahi Order is their Sufi lodge (tekke) and shrine (dargah) in Karagümrük, Istanbul. There are circles throughout Turkey and branches in some European countries, Australia, South Africa, South America and North America, including Los Angeles, New York, Mexico, San Francisco, Toronto and Chicago. Communities of the Jerrahi Order hold gatherings where the dervishes invoke remembrance ceremonies, practice sacred music, prepare and serve traditional cuisine, meditate and pray together, and engage in discourses with their Sufi guides. The traditional branch of the Jerrahi Order of America is in Chestnut Ridge, Rockland County, New York with a congregation of mixed immigrant and local convert backgrounds.

History
The Jerrahi way branched off from the Halveti Order, established by the Persian Sufi Umar Khalwati, who died in Tabriz in 800 AH/1397 CE.

The Halveti consider themselves heirs to the teachings of Junayd of Baghdad and usually have supported and followed the perspective of Ibn Arabi, especially as concerns the doctrine of wahdat al-wujud. Historically, they have also had a pro-Shi'ite tendency.

The members of the Halveti-Jerrahi Order point to the fact that Imam Ahmad ibn Uthman Sharnubi, the disciple and son-in-law of the qutb Ibrahim al-Desuqi, wrote in the Tabaqat al-Alwiya (Ranks of the Saints) some three hundred years before the birth of Pir Nureddin al-Jerrahi in 1089 AH/1678 CE:

Sayyid Nur al-din Jarrahi will be from Istanbul and will appear in the year 1115 A.H. He will live forty-four years. One of his miracles will be that he will see his station in heaven while in this world, and will enter paradise directly upon his demise. The prayers of those who visit him and of those who pray in his presence will be accepted by God.

Pir Nureddin would someday sign the book by this passage, which is currently in the Fatih Library in Istanbul (#3286).

Through his father he was a descendent of Abu Ubayda ibn al-Jarrah, one of the ten companions whose inclusion in paradise, according to tradition, was announced in this world by the Prophet Muhammad. At the age of nineteen he finished his study of Sharia with honors and Sultan Mustafa II appointed him chief justice (qadi) of Egypt, which was then a province of the Ottoman realm.  As he traveled through Istanbul on horseback, trailed by an entourage, in order to bid farewell to his family, he visited his maternal uncle, across from whose house was the dergah of the Jelveti-Halveti Order of dervishes in Üsküdar. His uncle took him to meet the Sheikh Ali Alaeddin al-Halveti Köstendili who knew his name before the introduction. During the zikr ceremony Nureddin experienced a state of ecstasy and immediately devoted himself to Sheikh Ali Alaeddin who ordered that he now put the world behind him. Nureddin, therefore, resigned from his honored post, dispersed his followers, and gave all his possessions to members of his family. He entered the spiritual retreat (halvet), spending a period of forty days in seclusion and fasting. For the next seven years he studied with his spiritual guide, until the age of twenty-six he himself was crowned a Sheikh.

His now famous Sufi lodge (tekke) was an Ottoman structure inaugurated for him in the year 1115 AH/1704 CE by the then reigning Sultan Ahmed III and it still stands in the Karagümrük, Fatih neighborhood of Istanbul today. In this year he received the secret Divine Names, the customs and ways (adab), and the meditations and invocations unique to his order –the Wird-i Kabir-i Sabahiyyah (“the Great Morning Litany”) and the Wird-i Saghir-i Masaiyyah (“the Great Evening Litany”)– all through divine inspiration.

Initially the dergah of the Jerrahis in Fatih attracted the aristocracy and administrators of the Ottoman Empire, just as the Mevlevi Order at that time attracted intellectuals and artists, the Bektashi Order drew the military, and the Naqshbandi Order the clergy. Today people from all walks of life gather there for zikr.

Indeed unique to the Jerrahis is their elaborate zikr, which originated as particular gifts given in recognition of Pir Nureddin’s station (maqām). It is traditionally held that the blue sheepskin upon which the Grand Sheikh of the dergah sits was a gift of Hazreti Aziz Mahmud Hudayi of the Jelveti-Halveti Order. The part of the Sheikh’s turban that hangs on the left side of the taj was a gift from Abdul Qadir Gilani. Ahmad al-Rifaʽi sent the metal top of the banner and the qiyam zikr. Majesty came from Ibrahim al-Desuqi and Beauty came from Ahmad al-Badawi, who also sent a secret zikr ritual known as the topu bedevi. From the Naqshbandi came the recitation of the Qur’an during the zikr ceremony. Shamsuddin Siwasi sent the first chant sung in the zikr and Sheikh Wafa sent the invocations chanted during the final circumambulations. From Mevlânâ Rūmī came the Sultan Walad Walk during the Sema rite. And from Hazreti Sünbül Efendi came the meditation on the Divine Name: Ya Hayy (O, Ever-Living and Eternal), which is repeated as part of the devren or circular movement in the zikr.  Within the Jerrahi tariqa can be found essential elements of many different Sufi Orders.

The Jerrahi zikr is evoked aloud and rhythmically, using musical compositions derived from various brotherhoods. Group singers stand aside the circle of dervishes along with musicians playing bendir and kudüm used for rhythm. In the zikr ceremony the dervishes kneel in a perfect circle reciting the sacred invocation of Divine Unity (Lailahailla’Llah), followed by the sacred invocation of the Most Divine Name (Allah), and then the sacred invocation of the Divine Essence (Hu). Between each cycle there is a Quranic recitation and a supplication. The dervishes then arise and chant the sacred ballad, the initial ilahi given by Shamsuddin Siwasi.  They continue with the repetition of Divine Essence (Hu) and the Divine Names.

Each dervish is given certain invocations and Sacred Names, according to his or her place on their path in life.

Since Pir Nureddin Jerrahi, twenty sheikhs have knelt upon the blessed blue sheepskin seat at the principal dergah in Karagümrük and followed Islamic principles in order to bind themselves to the Beloved. Nineteen of these sheikhs, along with Pir Nureddin and his family, are entombed in the dergah. The nineteenth, Hajji Sheikh Muzaffer Özak Âșkî al-Jerrahi, came to America and initiated a branch of the order in the West. Sheikh Muzaffer’s greatest dream was to share with humanity the secrets within the invocation of Divine Unity. He passed away into the realm of pre-eternity in Istanbul on 12 February 1985, his head bowed in prayer, his lips and heart humming the invocation of Unity, Lailahailla’Llah, one final time.

Sheikh Muzaffer Ozak's most prominent disciples and successors in North America were Tosun Bayrak, Lex Hixon, and Philippa de Menil. Following Ozak's death, the tariqa was split into the Nur Ashki Jerrahi Sufi Order and the Jerrahi Order of America, with the former reflecting a more "universalistic" orientation, and the latter a more "traditional" one. Sheikh Muzaffer consciously fostered different interpretations of his teachings while also showing it was not his intention to have the Halveti-Jerrahi Order separated. Moreover, he grew to embrace the more adaptive interpretations of his message over the more conservative, yet still legitimate perspective of traditionalists.

Sheikh Sefer Dal was Grand Sheikh of the Order from 1985 until his own death in 1999. Sheikh Ömer Tuğrul İnançer Efendi was Grand Sheikh of the Order between 1999 and 2022. According to Gift of the Givers founder Imtiaz Sooliman, it was Sefer Dal, 20th Grand Sheikh of the Order, who advised him to establish the organization during a visit to Dal's Istanbul lodge in Fatih.

During the Bosnian War, the Order's American branch worked with the Fellowship of Reconciliation to bring 160 Bosnian refugees to the US. Inancer was a speaker at the World Sufi Forum organized by the All India Ulema and Mashaikh Board in 2016.

See also
 Khalwati Order
 Muzaffer Ozak
 Ömer Tuğrul İnançer
 Ahmet Özhan
 Tosun Bayrak
 Lex Hixon
 Fariha al Jerrahi
 Nur Ashki Jerrahi Sufi Order
 Malamatiyya
 Mevlevi Order
 Bektashiyyah
 Bayramiyya

References

External links
 Halveti Jerrahi order of America
 Halveti Jerrahi order in Mexico
 Halveti Jerrahi order in Canada
 Halveti Jerrahi order in Argentina, tekke of Orhan Baba. Murillo 686, Buenos Aires  Tel: (5411) 48575336 
 Halveti Jerrahi order in Argentina
 Halveti Jerrahi in Chicago
 Halveti Jerrahi in Los Angeles
 Halveti Jerrahi order in Italy
 Halveti Jerrahi Order in Brazil
 Nur Ashki Jerrahi Order in New York
 Zawiya of the Tariqa Halveti-Cerrahi in Granada, Spain 
 First khalyfa Jerrahi in Italy (died 2010)
 Interview with Sheikh Tosun Bayrak al-Jerrahi
 Interview with Sheikh Ragip al-Jerrahi
 Interviews with Rabbi David Edelman and Sheikh Tosun Bayrak al-Jerrahi
 The Unveiling of Love Sufism and the Remembrance of God By Sheikh Muzaffer Ozak
 IRSHAD Wisdom of a Sufi Master By Sheikh Muzaffer Ozak Al-Jerrahi
 Garden of Paradise - Sufi Ceremony of Remembrance - Music CD Sheikh Muzzafer Ozak and the Halveti-Jerrahi Order of Dervishes
 Lifting the Boundaries: Muzaffer Efendi and the Transmission of Sufism to the West by Gregory Blann

Sufi orders
Khalwati order